The Voice – Najljepši glas Hrvatske is a Croatian television music competition to find new singing talent. The first series began on 17 January 2015 and ended on 25 April 2015. The show was co-presented by Ivan Vukušić and Iva Šulentić on HRT. The series was won by Nina Kraljić, who was on Jacques Houdek's team.

Teams 
Key

Battle rounds
Six artists from each team progressed to the live shows. Each coach pitted two of their twelve artists together as they performed a song of the coach's choice at the same time in a boxing ring-styled stage. After the two artists completed the song, one progressed to the live shows and one was eliminated from the competition. Once the coaches had completed this process, they each had five artists for the live shows.

The battle advisors for these episodes were: Marija Husar and Boris Đurđević working with Indira Levak, Aljoša Šerić and Maja Posavec working with Ivan Dečak, Miro Buljan and Djordija Palić working with Tony Cetinski, and Tihomir Preradović and Marina Đurović Čelić working with Jacques Houdek.

The battle round episodes aired on the 21 and 28 February and 07 and 14 March 2015.

Colour key

Episode 1 (21 February)
The first of four battle rounds premiered on 21 February 2015.

Episode 2 (28 February)
The second of four battle rounds premiered on 28 February 2015.

Episode 3 (07 March)
The third of four battle rounds premiered on 7 March 2015.

Episode 4 (14 March)
The fourth of four battle rounds premiered on 14 March 2015.

Live shows

Results summary
Colour key

Live show details

Week 1 (21 March) 
The first live show aired on 21 March 2015.

Week 2 (28 March) 
The second live show aired on 28 March 2015.

Week 3 (04 April) 
The third live show aired on 4 April 2015.

Week 4 (11 April) 
The fourth live show aired on 11 April 2015.

Opening act: Medley
 Team Jacques: "Stotinama godina"
 Team Tony: "Blago onom ko te ima"
 Team Ivan: "Tremolo"
 Team Indira: "Svijet voli pobjednike"

Week 5: Semi-final (18 April) 
The Semi-final live show aired on 18 April 2015.

Performance with the coach:
Team Ivan: "Treblebass"
Team Indira: "Najbolje od svega"
Team Tony: "Treba imat dušu"
Team Jacques: "True Colors"

Week 6: Final (25 April) 
The Final live show aired on 25 April 2015. Each coach had one artist each in their team, and for the first time in the series, each artist performed three songs: two solo numbers and a duet with their coach.

Opening act: Coaches singing "The Winner Takes It All" by ABBA with their team advisorsInterval act: Top 24 singing "Oprosti" by Gibonni

Elimination Chart

Overall

Color key
Artist's info

Result details

References

2015 Croatian television seasons
Croatia